Elegua (Yoruba: Èṣù-Ẹlẹ́gbára, also spelled Eleggua; known as Eleguá in Latin America and Spanish-speaking Caribbean islands) is an Orisha, a deity of roads in the religions of Santería, Winti, Umbanda, Quimbanda, Holy Infant of Atocha, and Candomblé.

In Africa 

Elegua is known as Èṣù-Ẹlẹ́gbára in the Yoruba religion and is closely associated with Eshu. Ẹlẹ́gbára means the "master of force" in the Yoruba language.

Santería 
Eleguá (Legba) is known in the Dominican Republic, Haiti, Colombia, Cuba and Puerto Rico as the orisha and "owner" of caminos, or roads and paths. All ceremonies and rituals in Santería must first have the approval of Eleguá before progressing. He is the messenger of Olofi. Within the "Regla de Ocha" [Cuba], he slightly differs from Echu, who in this case is seen as his brother, by having less dangerous and less aggressive characteristics. Eleguá moves silently; in contrast, Echu "breaks through". Manifestations of Eleguá includes Akefun, Aleshujade, Arabobo, Awanjonu, Lalafán, Obasín, Oparicocha, and Osokere.

There is a patakí (story) in Santería in which Olodumare gives Eleguá the keys to the past, present, and future; for this reason, Eleguá is often depicted holding a set of keys. A figure of Eleguá may be placed in the house behind the entrance door.

In Brazil
In Afro-Brazilian religion Elegbara is one of the titles of Exu.

See also 
 Papa Legba

References

External links 
 Santeria cubana :: Tratado de Eshu-Elegbara
 Santeria.fr :: All About Eleggua 
 Santeria.fr :: Todo Sobre Eleggua 
 Santeria.fr :: Tout sur les Eleggua

Traditional African religions
Yoruba deities
Yoruba mythology
Brazilian deities
Crossroads mythology
Liminal deities
Trickster gods
Santería